"Iparhi Zoi" (Greek: Υπάρχει ζωή; English: There is life) is a song by Greek singer Despina Vandi, written by Phoebus. The song was first performed at the MAD Video Music Awards 2009 on June 23, but was released to Greek radio stations a week in advance to promote the song and create publicity for Vandi's first new song since her 2007 album 10 Hronia Mazi. It was released as a digital download by Heaven Music on July 13. The song reached number one on Greek Digital Downloads Charts for five weeks in which the three was in a row and topped the Greek airplay charts for four weeks. According to the Greek "Chart Show" and IFPI, the song is in the twenty seventh position in the Top 30 with the Greek songs which were most radio airplay during 2005-2010.

Music video
The music video for the song was created using the footage from Vandi's live performance at the MAD Video Music Awards 2009. The choreography was arranged by Konstantinos Rigos.

Charts

Covers
Romana Paniċ covered the song using Serbian lyrics under the title "Dragi" in December 2009.

References

2009 singles
Despina Vandi songs
Number-one singles in Greece
Songs written by Phoebus (songwriter)
2009 songs